HMS Sea Devil was a S-class submarine of the third batch built for the Royal Navy during World War II. She survived the war and was sold for scrap in 1966.

Design and description
The third batch was slightly enlarged and improved over the preceding second batch of the S-class. They displaced  on the surface and  submerged. The S-class submarines had a crew of 48 officers and ratings.

For surface running, the boats were powered by two  diesel engines, each driving one propeller shaft. When submerged each propeller was driven by a  electric motor. They could reach  on the surface and  underwater.

Sea Devil was armed with six  torpedo tubes in the bow. She carried six reload torpedoes for a total of a dozen torpedoes. Twelve mines could be carried in lieu of the internally stowed torpedoes. The boat was also equipped with a  deck gun.

Construction and career
HMS Sea Devil was launched late in the Second World War, on 30 January 1945. Thus far she has been the only ship of the Royal Navy to bear the name Sea Devil. Her late commissioning meant that she was still on passage to the Far East when the war ended and therefore did not see any action. In 1953 she took part in the Fleet Review to celebrate the Coronation of Queen Elizabeth II.

In April 1954 Sea Devil deployed to the Mediterranean, and remained there for the rest of her active career. In 1955–1956 Sea Devil was used around Malta for tests of the Yellow Duckling infrared linescan system for detecting the wake of submerged submarines.

Sea Devil paid off for disposal at Portsmouth on 4 June 1962, the last of the S class in service with the Royal Navy, though other S-class boats remained in service with other navies. She was sold to the shipbreaker Metal Recoveries, and arrived at Newhaven on 15 December 1965.

Notes

References
 
  
 
 
 
 

 

British S-class submarines (1931)
1945 ships
World War II submarines of the United Kingdom
Ships built on the River Clyde
Royal Navy ship names